Under the Covers, Vol. III is the seventh studio album by the American musical comedy duo Ninja Sex Party, originally released on November 15, 2019. It is the third cover album released by the duo, following Under the Covers (2016) and Under the Covers, Vol. II (2017). Like its predecessors, it features renditions of pop and rock songs from the 1970s and 1980s.

While the album was teased for a late 2019 release, the official release date of the album was announced at the band's 10th anniversary show in Chicago on October 12, 2019.

As with the band's previous three albums, Under the Covers, Vol. III features contributions from TWRP as a backup band on all songs except "Safety Dance".

Track listing

Personnel
Credits adapted from the album's liner notes.

Ninja Sex Party
Dan Avidan – vocals, songwriting
Brian Wecht – keyboards, production

Production
 Jim Roach – production and engineering
 Mario Ramirez – engineering
 Thom Flowers – mixing
 Randy Merrill – mastering
 Tucker Prescott – photos
 Lazerhorse – album design

Additional musicians
 Tupper Ware Remix Party – backup band (all tracks except "Safety Dance")
 Lord Phobos – guitar
 Commander Meouch – bass
 Doctor Sung – talkbox, synthesizer
 Havve Hogan – drums
 Super Guitar Bros – acoustic guitars on "Don't Fear the Reaper"
 Jeff Driskill – saxophone on "Sledgehammer"
 Rashawn Ross – trumpet on "Sledgehammer"
 Garrett Smith – trombone on "Sledgehammer"
 Dallas Kruse – string arrangements on "Don't Fear the Reaper" and "Glory of Love"
 The Era Queens – backing vocals on "Sledgehammer"
 Jim Roach – additional guitars and synths

Charts

References

Ninja Sex Party albums
2019 albums
Covers albums